John Frizzell (born 1966) is an American film and television composer. As a young boy, Frizzell sang soprano in the National Cathedral Choir, the Paris Opera Company, and the Metropolitan Opera Company. However, once he hit puberty, his voice changed. He continued his study of music at the University of Southern California and the Manhattan School of Music, but he began to focus more on the jazz guitar than voice. After he finished college, Frizzell worked with Michael Mainieri, a famous producer and became exposed to synthesis and helped Mainieri on many commercials, movies and records.

Frizzell's career excelled and he worked with many more renowned composers, directors and producers including Ryuichi Sakamoto, John Sacret Young, James Newton Howard, Jean-Pierre Jeunet, Joel Silver, Randy Edelman and Mark Rydell. However, Frizzell is best known for his work with Mike Judge. He did the scores for Judge's films Beavis and Butt-Head Do America and Office Space as well as the music for Judge's sitcom King of the Hill. His other film scores include I Still Know What You Did Last Summer, Alien Resurrection, Dante's Peak, Thirteen Ghosts, Ghost Ship, Gods and Generals, Stay Alive, The Reaping and the 2020 documentary Zappa. He also composed the musical score for the sci-fi television series VR.5, more recently the television drama series The Following, Tell Me a Story and the 2020 animated comedy series, Duncanville. In 2022, he returned to composed the score for Beavis and Butt-Head Do  the Universe, as well as the score for the episodes of the series' new season.

Film scores

1995 
 Whose Daughter Is She?
 It Was Him or Us

1996 
 Deadly Pursuits
 Undertow
 Red Ribbon Blues
 Beavis and Butt-Head Do America
 The Rich Man's Wife
 Crime of the Century
 The Empty Mirror

1997 
 Opposite Corners
 Dante's Peak
 Alien Resurrection

1998 
 Mafia! (as Gianni Frizzelli)
 I Still Know What You Did Last Summer

1999 
 Office Space
 Teaching Mrs. Tingle
 The White River Kid

2000 
 Beautiful
 Lockdown
 Possessed

2001 
 Josie and the Pussycats
 James Dean
 Thirteen Ghosts

2002 
 Slap Shot 2: Breaking the Ice
 Ghost Ship

2003 
 Gods and Generals
 Cradle 2 the Grave
 The Whizzard of Ow

2004 
 The Goodbye Girl
 Karroll's Christmas

2005 
 The Prize Winner of Defiance, Ohio
 Four Minutes
 Wal-Mart: The High Cost of Low Price

2006 
 A Little Thing Called Murder
 Stay Alive
 The Woods

2007 
 Careless
 Primeval
 First Born
 The Reaping
 Black Irish
 Beneath

2008 
 Henry Poole Is Here
 Wisegal
 100 Feet
 Tenure

2009 
 Evil Angel
 The Lodger
 From Mexico with Love
 Whiteout

2010 
 Legion
 Shelter

2011 
 The Roommate

2013 
 Texas Chainsaw 3D

2014 
 The Loft

2016 
 When the Bough Breaks

2017
 Leatherface

2018
 The Possession of Hannah Grace

2020
 Zappa

2022
 Beavis and Butt-Head Do the Universe

External links

 John Frizzell Biography

1966 births
American film score composers
American male film score composers
American television composers
Composers from New York City
Living people
Male television composers
Manhattan School of Music alumni
USC Thornton School of Music alumni
Varèse Sarabande Records artists